The  is a metaseries of tokusatsu superhero TV series produced by Toei for Japanese television.

The protagonists of the Metal Hero Series are mainly space, military and police-based characters who are typically either androids, cyborgs, or human beings who don "metallic" armored suits. Henceforth, most of the Metal Heroes are also referenced as another example of the "Henshin (transforming) Heroes" genre. Usually, the genre revolves around a technological theme where technology, in the right hands, can be used for the greater good.

The shows were produced by Toei from 1982 through 1999 in conjunction with their other Tokusatsu superhero shows, Kamen Rider and Super Sentai. In addition to Japan, they are also popular in France, Brazil, the Philippines, Malaysia and Indonesia. During the 1990s, Saban Entertainment used some of the shows to produce programs similar to their Power Rangers series. Some of the Metal Hero Series even spawned such sequels which followed the continuity of the previous shows, resulting in the genre developing sub-categories based mainly on space, military and police-related characters.

List of Metal Hero Series 

 1982: 
 1983: 
 1984: 
 1985: 
 1986:  
 1987:  
 1988: 
 1989: 
 1990: 
 1991: 
 1992: 
 1993: 
 1994: 
 1995:  
 1996:  
 1997: 
 1998:

Theatrical releases 
 1984: Uchuu Keiji Shaider: The Movie"
 1984: Uchuu Keiji Shaider: Pursuit! The Strange Kidnappers! 1987: Choujinki Metalder: The Movie 1989: Kidou Keiji Jiban: The Movie Great Explosion at the Monster Factory of Fear 1993: Tokusou Robo Janperson 1994: Blue SWAT: The Movie 
 1995: Juukou B-Fighter: The Movie 2012: Kaizoku Sentai Gokaiger vs. Space Sheriff Gavan: The Movie 2012: Space Sheriff Gavan: The Movie 2013: Kamen Rider × Super Sentai × Space Sheriff: Super Hero Taisen Z V-Cinema releases 
 1998: B-Robo Kabutack: The Epic Christmas Battle 1999: Tetsuwan Tantei Robotack and Kabutack: The Great Strange Country Adventure 2014: Space Sheriff Sharivan: The Next Generation 2014: Space Sheriff Shaider: The Next Generation 2017: Space Squad: Gavan vs. Dekaranger 2017: Girls in Trouble: Space Squad Episode Zero 2018: Uchu Sentai Kyuranger vs. Space SquadTelevi Magazine Super Video/Special DVD
  Tokumei Sentai Go-Busters vs. Beet Buster vs. J  Space Sheriff Gavan Special DVD International adaptations 
 United States 
During the 1990s, Saban adapted Metal Hero Series shows for American audiences; stock footage from Metalder, Spielvan and Shaider was used in VR Troopers (1994–1996), and footage from both B-Fighter series was later used in Big Bad Beetleborgs. Both shows ran for two seasons. As of 2018, Discotek Media has licensed Juspion for release marking the first release of the Metal Heroes in the US. Both Jiraiya and Gavan were used for the Power Rangers franchise with Jiraiya as Sheriff Skyfire in Power Rangers Super Ninja Steel and Gavan as Captain Chaku in Power Rangers Beast Morphers.

 Philippines 
In 1987, Space Sheriff Shaider was the first Metal Hero series aired in the Philippines on GMA Network (then known as GMA Radio-Television Arts). Zaido: Pulis Pangkalawakan was greenlighted by Toei as a sequel to Shaider, with characters who are descendants of those in the original series. Toei later halted production, instead authorizing a spin-off series set 20 years after the end of Shaider.

In 1997, GMA Network aired Bettleborgs, produced by the American Saban Entertainment and adopted from both Juukou B-Fighter and B-Fighter Kabuto, pitting up against the Power Rangers series on its rival network ABS-CBN in which Saban also produced from the Super Sentai with Toei as well.

 Brazil 
The Metal Hero series were successful in Brazil. In 1988, Juspion (as Jaspion) was broadcast by TV Manchete. Manchete followed with Jiraiya in 1989, Jiban in 1990, Spielvan (renamed Jaspion 2) in 1991, Winspector in 1994 and Solbrain in 1995. Other networks also bought shows, with TV Bandeirantes broadcasting Metalder and Sharivan in 1990 and two networks (Rede Globo and TV Gazeta) airing Sheider and Gavan (renamed Gyaban) in 1991. Jaspion, Jiraiya and Jiban were later released on DVD in the country.

Until 2016, most of the series that were released in Brazilian television in 80's and 90's are going to Netflix, Amazon Prime Video and Playplus in Brazil. The distribution company Sato Company acquired many of those series and negotiated with Netflix. Also, some new products like Garo series are in these negotiations too.

Current status
Other similar heroes, such as Nebula Mask Machine Man, Kyodai Ken Byclosser, Lady Battle Cop, and Choukou Senshi Changéríon, were also produced during the time that the Metal Hero Series were on the air, but are not included as part of the Metal Hero Series for various reasons. Machine Man and Bicrosser were created by Shotaro Ishinomori, while Changéríon's armor is not metallic and aired on TV Tokyo. It's unknown if Lady Battle Cop is part of Toei's shared universe.

Currently, the Metal Hero Series were one of Toei's defunct genres as the company rather favors more of the Super Sentai and Kamen Rider Series of shows and allegedly the passing of Shotaro Ishinomori. Although, many of the Metal Hero traits have been adopted into the new generation of Super Sentai and Kamen Rider shows. Today, the present versions of this type of heroes are also merged in with the Henshin Heroes description.

Some Metal Heroes have also made cameo appearances. In 2004, a special Tokusou Sentai Dekaranger stage show had a special appearance by Gavan, who assisted Hurricane Red from Ninpuu Sentai Hurricaneger and Aba Red from Bakuryuu Sentai Abaranger in battling various Alienizer monsters from Deka Ranger.

In 2005, Toei released some Uchuu Keiji trilogy merchandise. Later that year, Bandai released a "Souchaku Henshin" figure of Gavan, followed by "Souchaku Henshin" figures of Sharivan and Shaider in early 2006. In May 2006, a PlayStation 2 video game titled The Space Sheriff Spirits was released. The game featured Gavan, Sharivan and Shaider all teaming up to battle past enemies from their series. The game was panned by critics, however, for bland graphics and dull gameplay. In early 2008, the trading card company Cardass announced a new, Metal Heroes based expansion to their Rangers Strike card game, entitled Special Metal Edition, featuring characters and vehicles from the various Metal Hero Series'' for use within the game.

Despite no more television series having been made, the Space Sheriff Series re-emerged in the 2010s with feature films, including new actors portraying successors to Gavan, Sharivan, and Shaider. Some of them are stand alone entries, while others feature crossovers with other Super Sentai and Kamen Rider characters.

References 

 
Toei tokusatsu
Bandai brands